Ori or ORI may refer to:

People 
 Ori (Hebrew), a Hebrew given name, and a list of Israeli people with the name
 Ori Kowarsky (born 1970), Canadian filmmaker and lawyer
 Ōri Umesaka (1900–1965), Japanese photographer
 Amos Ori (born 1956), Israeli physicist and professor
 Györgyi Őri (born 1955), Hungarian former handball player
 Israel Ori (1658–1711), a prominent figure of the Armenian national liberation movement and diplomat
 Valvil Ori, a king in what is now Tamil Nadu, India around 200 AD

Fictional or mythical characters 
 Ori – see List of dwarfs in Norse mythology
 Ori (Middle-earth), a dwarf in J. R. R. Tolkien's legendarium of Middle-earth
 Ori (Stargate), fictional evil beings in the Stargate SG-1 television series
 Ori, the titular protagonist of the Ori and the Blind Forest and Ori and the Will of the Wisps video games

Acronyms 
 Obsessive relational intrusion 
 United States Office of Research Integrity, a government body
 Old Republic International, a property insurance and title and deed Fortune 500 company based in Chicago
 IATA airport code and FAA location identifier for Port Lions Airport, Alaska
 Origin of replication in cellular biology
 Oregon Research Institute, a psychology research institute in Eugene, Oregon
 Oriental Research Institute & Manuscripts Library, University of Kerala, India
 Orientation (sign language)

Other uses 
 A standard astronomical abbreviation for Orion (constellation)
 Ori (genetics), the origin of replication signal for DNA replication
 Ori (Yoruba), a metaphysical concept important to Yoruba spirituality and Orisha worship
 Pic d'Orhy, aka Ori, a mountain in the Pyrenees
 Ori Station, a Seoul Metropolitan Subway station
 The Oriental Hotel, also known as the Ori, a pub in Australia
 ori, ISO 639-3 code for the Odia language of India